Noelia Oncina Moreno (born 9 November 1976) is a Spanish handball player. She played for the club Parc Sagunto, and was captain on the Spanish national team. She currently is one of the coaches of BM Morvedre senior team 

She competed at the 2004 Summer Olympics in Athens, where the Spanish team reached the quarter finals, and finished 6th in the tournament.

She was captain for the Spanish team at the 2008 European Women's Handball Championship, where Spain reached the final, after defeating Germany in the semifinal.

References

External links

1976 births
Living people
Sportspeople from Málaga
Spanish female handball players
Olympic handball players of Spain
Handball players at the 2004 Summer Olympics
Competitors at the 2001 Mediterranean Games
Competitors at the 2005 Mediterranean Games
Mediterranean Games gold medalists for Spain
Mediterranean Games silver medalists for Spain
Mediterranean Games medalists in handball